Shaker Wahib al-Fahdawi al-Dulaimi (1986 – May 6, 2016), better known as Abu Waheeb ("Father of Waheeb"; Arabic: أبو وهيب), was a leader of the Islamic State in Anbar, Iraq. He killed three Syrian truck drivers in Iraq in the summer of 2013, and was himself killed, with three others, in a United States-led coalition airstrike in May 2016, according to the US Department of Defense.

Biography 
Fahdawi was born in 1986. In 2006, while studying computer science at the University of Anbar, he was arrested by US forces on charges of belonging to Al-Qaeda in Iraq. Following his arrest, Fahdawi was detained by US forces at the Camp Bucca detention facility in southern Iraq until 2009, when he was sentenced to death and moved to Tikrit Central Prison in the Saladin Governorate.

Fahdawi was one of 110 detainees who escaped the prison in 2012, following a riot and an attack by forces from the Islamic State of Iraq. He had learnt from the senior ISIS leaders he had been imprisoned with, and he became a field commander in Anbar province after his release. Iraqi officials blamed him for a long list of terror-related offences and put a $50,000 bounty on him.

By 2014, Fahdawi was playing an important role in leading combat operations of the group, now known as Islamic State in Iraq and the Levant, in Anbar.

Death 
On May 6, 2016, the Pentagon said Abu Waheeb was killed along with three others in a vehicle by a US airstrike near Rutba.

Orlando nightclub shooting 

According to transcripts, Omar Mateen, the perpetrator of the Orlando nightclub shooting, said that the attack was a response to the killing of Abu Waheeb. Mateen stated his attack was "triggered" by a May 6, 2016 U.S. bombing strike that killed Abu Waheeb. Mateen's words were: "That's what triggered it, OK? They should have not bombed and killed Abu [Waheeb]."

References 

1986 births
2016 deaths
Islamic State of Iraq and the Levant members from Iraq
Escapees from Iraqi detention
Members of al-Qaeda in Iraq
Assassinated ISIL members
Deaths by airstrike during the Syrian civil war